Louis Roels (12 August 1912 – 17 September 1984) was a Belgian racing cyclist. He won the Belgian national road race title in 1934.

References

External links

1912 births
1984 deaths
Belgian male cyclists
People from Hamme
Cyclists from East Flanders